Zibo Railway Station is a first class railway station in Zhangdian District, Zibo, Shandong operated by China Railway Jinan Group. It has four platforms and 15 tracks. The annual passenger traffic is 6.2 million. It is a part of the Qingdao–Yinchuan corridor, Xindian–Taian railway, Qingdao–Jinan passenger railway and Zibo–Dongying railway.

On 16 September 2022, a new station building to the south of the line was opened.

References

Railway stations in Shandong